Wakefield High School is a Wake County public high school located in Raleigh, North Carolina. The school is adjacent to Wakefield Elementary and Wakefield Middle schools.

History 
Wakefield High School's building was completed and opened in 1999. For the 1999–2000 school year, the building was occupied by students from Sanderson High School, while their school was under renovation. For that school year, the name of the school was Sanderson High School at Wakefield. In 2000, Wakefield students inhabited the building for the first official school year of Wakefield High.

Schedule 
The school year at Wakefield High School starts in late August and ends in early June. The class schedule, commonly referred to as "block scheduling", has four different classes each semester, each block being approximately ninety minutes long. This completes a course in one semester instead of one year and provides four new classes in the second semester. Students take exams in mid-January and again in early June.

In the 2009–2010 school year, a different type of lunch block was created called "SMART" lunch. Instead of multiple 30-minute lunch blocks, a single 55-minute block between blocks 3 and 4 was established where all students and staff would eat lunch together, unless the student had an off-campus pass they wished to use. Many school clubs were held during the lunch block, along with teacher help sessions. This "SMART" lunch was removed about 5 years later in October 2016 by then principal Malik Bazzell, who said that "only nine percent of the students actually utilized SMART lunch on a daily basis and 91 percent were out and about doing whatever." This decision by the principal was opposed by many of the students and some teachers, especially those who utilized the time. While there was a small overlap at the beginning of the 2016–2017 school year, a new 35-minute block called "Pride Time" was created primarily to replace SMART lunch. "Pride Time" was similar in many ways to SMART lunch, with the main difference being a shorter block time and comparatively less freedom over movement. Students who had a grade point average lower than 75 were required to go to receive extra help during Pride Time in any classes they may have been struggling in. Pride Time would also later be removed for various reasons in the 2021–2022 school year, and no substitute for this time would be made.

As of the 2022–2023 school year, Wakefield High School offers the following 16 Advanced Placement (AP) courses for: Biology, Calculus, Chemistry, Computer Science A, Computer Science Principles, English III (Language and Composition), English IV (Literature and Composition), Environmental Science, Human Geography, Psychology, Statistics, Studio Art-2D Design, Studio Art-Drawing, U.S. Government and Politics, U.S. History, and Visual Arts-3D Design.

Athletics 
Wakefield's students compete in the NCHSAA 4-AA classification in the CAP-7 conference. Wakefield's biggest rivalry in sports is with the cross-town Wake Forest Cougars,Heritage Huskies, and Millbrook Wildcats.

As of the 2022–2023 school year, Wakefield High School offers the following 22 athletic programs for the fall, winter, and spring seasons:

Fall Sports: Cheer, Cross Country, Football, Women's Golf, Gymnastics, Men's Soccer, Women's Tennis, and Volleyball

Winter Sports: Men's Basketball, Women's Basketball, Cheer, Indoor Track, Swimming & Diving, and Wrestling

Spring Sports: Baseball, Men's Golf, Men's Lacrosse, Women's Lacrosse, Women's Soccer, Softball, Stunt, Track

Clubs and organizations 
As of the 2022–2023 school year, Wakefield High offers the following 45 clubs and organizations: African Student Association, American Sign Language Club, Asian Culture Club, Best Buddies, Beta Club, Black Student Union, Blockchain and Cryptocurrency Club, Book and Literacy Club, Chick-Fil-A Leadership Academy, Debate Club, Drama Club, Dungeons & Dragons, Eats and Treats Baking Club, FBLA (Future Business Leaders of America) and DECA (Distributive Education Clubs of America), FCA (Fellowship of Christian Athletes), FCCLA (Family, Career and Community Leaders of America), FFA (Future Farmers of America), Forces of Nature, French Club, Frisbee Club, German Club, International Thespian Honor Society, Japan club, Key Club, Latin Club, Latin Student Union, LGBTQ Pride Club, Mindfulness Club, Mu Alpha Theta, National Achievers Society, National Art Honor Society, National English Honor Society, National Honor Society, National Technical Honor Society, Newspaper Club (The Howler), Pickleball Club, Rho Kappa National Social Studies Honor Society, Science Honor Society, Science Olympiad, Spanish Honor Society, Student Council, Video Game Club, Wackos, and Yearbook Club, and Zine.

The school's student newspaper, The Howler, includes open student forums, opinion articles, students' life articles, and a "Fri-Yay" blog among other media. The mission of The Howler is to provide unbiased and accurate news coverage to the students and faculty at Wakefield and to the surrounding community.The Howler won the North Carolina Scholastic Media Association’s Tar Heel award for excellence in journalism in 2016, 2019, 2021, and 2022.

Wakefield Theatre Company 
The school's theater program was founded at the same time as the school in 2000. The program was established to teach students about the performing arts and to provide multiple opportunities for students to view each other's dramatic work. On average, Wakefield Theatre Company holds somewhere between four to eight plays a year. The program also organizes the school's Drama Club meetings.

Statistics (2021–2022 school year) 
 Wakefield High School has 2,151 students; composed of 1,155 males and 996 females.
 As for student demographics; 44% of the students are White, 30% are Black, 18% are Hispanic, 5% are Asian, 3% are two or more races, <1% are American Indian/ Alaskan Native, and <1% are Native Hawaiian/ Pacific Islander. 20% of students are eligible to receive free or reduced-price lunches.
 There are 645 Freshmen, 549 Sophomores, 488 Juniors, and 469 Seniors that are registered as students.
 The student teacher ratio is approximately 19:1.

Notable alumni 
 Darius Johnson-Odom, NBA player
 Doug Polk, professional poker player
 Justin Hughes, former professional soccer player
 Justin Willis, former professional soccer player
 T. J. Graham, NFL wide receiver
 Tim Adleman, former MLB pitcher for the Cincinnati Reds
 Tye Smith, NFL cornerback

References

External links 
 

1999 establishments in North Carolina
Education in Raleigh, North Carolina
Educational institutions established in 1999
Public high schools in North Carolina
Schools in Raleigh, North Carolina
Wake County Public School System